Dušan Džamonja (31 January 1928 – 14 January 2009) was a Yugoslav sculptor of Serbian ancestry.

Education and career
Džamonja was born in 1928 in Strumica, former Vardar Banovina, Kingdom of Yugoslavia.  In 1945, Džamonja began his studies at the Academy of Fine Arts in Zagreb under the professors Vanja Radauš, Frano Kršinić and Antun Augustinčić, all notable artists. In 1951, he graduated in the master class of professor Antun Augustinčić. He worked in the Krsinic workshop from 1951 until 1953 when he started his own workshop in Zagreb.

In 1954 he held his first solo exhibition in the Salon ULUH in Zagreb. In 1970, he began the construction of his house and workshop in Vrsar, Istria according to his own design.

Artistic style
Džamonja drew primarily in chalk and used the technique of washed ink; however, he leaned towards sculpture early on. He used many materials, from bronze and iron to wood, glass, concrete and polyester in his sculptures.

Works
His works are in numerous public and private collections, museums and galleries in the country and abroad. However, his most notable works are: 
 Dušan Džamonja's Park of Sculptures, near Vrsar, is a famous and cultural tourist attraction. 
 Monument to the Revolution (1967), World War II memorial in Podgarić, Croatia. 
He designed many monumental memorial complexes. These include:  
 The Revolution Memorial in Podgarić, Croatia.
 Monument to the Revolution on Mrakovica Mountain, Kozara National Park, Republika Srpska, Bosnia & Herzegovina. 
 The Memorial Ossuary to the Fallen Yugoslav Soldiers of the First and Second World Wars in southern Italy, Barletta. 
He designed a number of monuments to the Partisans and victims of concentration camps, most notably the Memorial Ossuary at Barletta, near Ban (completed 1970) and the Monument to the Battle of Kozara (completed 1972).

Awards and accomplishments
He was a recipient of numerous awards and was an academician with both Croatian Academy of Sciences and Arts and Serbian Academy of Sciences and Arts. Below is a list of his awards:

1958 Third and Fourth Award for conceptual design for Memorial in Jaijinci, Yugoslavia  
1959 One of six identical awards on international competition for Monument to the Victims of Dachau, Germany First Award for sculpture, Salon 59, Rijeka, Croatia  
1960 City of Zagreb Award, Croatia  
1961 Premio Morgan's Paint, Rimini, Italy First Award for sculpture, First Triennale of Modern Sculpture, Beograd, Yugoslavia  
1962 Fourth Award, National competition for Monument to Revolution in Slavonija, Kamensko, Croatia    
1963 Second Award, IV Biennale, San Marino, Italy    
1965 Gold Medal for artistic activity, Veruchio, Italy  
1968 Second Award on the competition for Monument to Victims of Fascism in Podhum, Rijeka, Croatia First Award for Memorial Ossuary in Barletta, Italy  
1970 First Award for Monument to Revolution, Kozara, Bosnia  
1974 Second Award for design of Memorial Ossuary, Roma, Italy First Award for conceptual design for Memorial to Victory and Fallen Fighters, Sremski Front 1944–45, Yugoslavia  
1977 Rembrandt Prize, Goethe Stiftung zu Basel, Switzerland    
1980 Second Award for conceptual design for Monument to Edvard Kardelj, Ljubljana, Slovenia  
1982 Second Award for National Competition for the Monument in Jajinci, Beograd, Yugoslavia  
1983 Third Award, Terceiro Biennale der Europäischen Grafik, Baden-Baden, Germany  1986 Award of the Jury, Biennale of Original Drawing, Rijeka, Croatia
1990 Second Prize for the design of the Monument on Rhein - Main - Donau Kanal, Germany

References

External links

 Brown to dedicate sculpture by Yugoslavia’s Dusan Dzamonja Oct. 12, 1990
 Art Site of Dušan Džamonja
 Interview with Dušan Džamonja / Sculpture as a Spiritual Adventure, Croatia (inflight magazine), spring/2002

1928 births
2009 deaths
People from Strumica
Serbs of Croatia
Croatian sculptors
Serbian sculptors
Male sculptors
Modern sculptors
Members of the Croatian Academy of Sciences and Arts
Members of the Serbian Academy of Sciences and Arts
Academy of Fine Arts, University of Zagreb alumni
Vladimir Nazor Award winners
Macedonian artists
Burials at Mirogoj Cemetery